Darkstalkers Chronicle: The Chaos Tower, known in Japan as  in Japan, is a Capcom fighting game for the PlayStation Portable. It was released on December 12, 2004, alongside the PSP at launch in Japan, in North America on March 24, 2005 for the North American PSP launch and in Europe on September 1.

It is a port of the Japan-only Dreamcast game Vampire Chronicle for Matching Service, which in turn is a version of Vampire Savior that allows players to choose their fighting style from all five Darkstalkers/Vampire arcade games (Vampire: The Night Warriors, Vampire Hunter: Darkstalker's Revenge, Vampire Savior: The Lord of Vampires, and the Japan-only Vampire Hunter 2 and Vampire Savior 2).

Gameplay
The game has all the characters from prior installments of the series and includes all the endings and moves from the games: Darkstalkers, Night Warriors: Darkstalkers' Revenge, and Darkstalkers 3. The complete soundtracks from all three games are also selectable based on play style. However, the levels, selection screen, and character endings are all from Vampire Savior 2.

Reception

Famitsu magazine gave the original Dreamcast version of the game a score of 31 out of 40. Darkstalkers Chronicle: The Chaos Tower has the Metacritic score of 74 out of 100.

It was one of the three games nominated by GameSpot for the title of the Best Fighting Game of 2005, as (at the time) "probably the best portable fighting game ever made". In 2010, GamesRadar included Darkstalkers Chronicle among five PSP "essentials that are genuinely essential", adding: "This 2D fighter is seldom mentioned these days, which is frankly criminal". In 2011, Complex ranked it as the 41st best fighting game of all time.

References

External links

2000 video games
Darkstalkers video games
PlayStation Portable games
Video games developed in Japan
Video games scored by Tetsuya Shibata
Video game remakes
Dreamcast games
Multiplayer and single-player video games